The 2018–19 Bowling Green Falcons men's basketball team represented Bowling Green State University during the 2017–18 NCAA Division I men's basketball season. The Falcons were led by fourth-year head coach Michael Huger, and played their home games at the Stroh Center as members of the East Division of the Mid-American Conference. They finished the season 22–12 overall, 12–6 in MAC play to finish second place in the East Division. As the No. 3 seed in the MAC tournament, they advanced to the championship game, where they were defeated by Buffalo. They declined any offer to play in a postseason tournament.

Previous season
The Falcons finished the 2017–18 season 16–16, 7–11 in MAC play to finish in a tie for fourth place. As the No. 9 seed in the MAC tournament, they lost in the first round to Central Michigan.

Roster

Schedule and results
The 2018-19 schedule was released on August 1, 2018. The Falcons will participate in the Legends Classic, competing in the Detroit Subregional.

|-
!colspan=9 style=|Exhibition

|-
!colspan=9 style=|Non-conference regular season

|-
!colspan=9 style=|MAC regular season

|-
!colspan=9 style=| MAC tournament

See also
2018–19 Bowling Green Falcons women's basketball team

References

Bowling Green
Bowling Green Falcons men's basketball seasons